Edward Ward (11 July 1896 – 10 August 1966) was a Barbadian cricket umpire. He stood in one Test match, West Indies vs. England, in 1935. He also played in one first-class cricket match for Barbados in 1928/29.

See also
 List of Test cricket umpires
 English cricket team in West Indies in 1934–35

References

1896 births
1966 deaths
Barbadian cricketers
West Indian Test cricket umpires
People from Saint John, Barbados
Barbadian cricket umpires
Barbados cricketers